Push Pull is the sixth studio album by American rock band Hoobastank, released on May 25, 2018 via Napalm. The album features a more pop rock sound with funk rock influences, different from the characteristic post-grunge and alternative style of the band.

The album peaked at number 35 on Billboards Independent Albums chart.

Track listing

Personnel
Hoobastank
 Doug Robb – lead vocals, rhythm guitar
 Daniel Estrin – lead guitar
 Chris Hesse – drums
 Jesse Charland – bass, backing vocals

Production
 Matt Wallace – production
 Paul David Hager – mixing
 Chris Hesse – mixing
 Emily Lazar – mastering

References

2018 albums
Hoobastank albums
Napalm Records albums